The Reverend is an honorific style given before the names of certain Christian clergy and ministers. There are sometimes differences in the way the style is used in different countries and church traditions. The Reverend is correctly called a style, but is sometimes referred to as a title, form of address, or title of respect. The style is also sometimes used by leaders in other religions such as Judaism and Buddhism.

The term is an anglicisation of the Latin reverendus, the style originally used in Latin documents in medieval Europe. It is the gerundive or future passive participle of the verb revereri ("to respect; to revere"), meaning "[one who is] to be revered/must be respected". The Reverend is therefore equivalent to The Honourable or The Venerable. It is paired with a modifier or noun for some offices in some religious traditions: Lutheran archbishops, Anglican archbishops, and most Catholic bishops are usually styled The Most Reverend (reverendissimus); other Lutheran bishops, Anglican bishops, and Catholic bishops are styled The Right Reverend.

With Christian clergy, the forms His Reverence and Her Reverence are also sometimes used, along with their parallel in direct address, Your Reverence. The abbreviation HR is sometimes used.

Usage 
In traditional and formal English usage it is still considered incorrect to drop the definite article, the, before Reverend. In practice, however, the is often not used in both written and spoken English. When the style is used within a sentence, the is correctly in lower-case. The usual abbreviations for Reverend are Rev., Revd and Rev'd.
 
The Reverend is traditionally used as an adjectival form with first names (or initials) and surname (e.g. The Reverend John Smith or The Reverend J. F. Smith); The Reverend Father Smith or The Reverend Mr Smith are correct though now old-fashioned uses. Use of the prefix with the surname alone (The Reverend Smith) is considered a solecism in traditional usage: it would be as irregular as calling the person in question "The Well-Respected Smith". In some countries, especially Britain, Anglican clergy are acceptably addressed by the title of their office, such as Vicar, Rector, or Archdeacon.

In the 20th and 21st centuries, it has been increasingly common for reverend to be used as a noun and for clergy to be referred to as being either a reverend or the reverend (I talked to the reverend about the wedding service.) or to be addressed as Reverend or, for example, Reverend Smith or the Reverend Smith. This has traditionally been considered grammatically incorrect on the basis that it is equivalent to referring to a judge as being an honourable or an adult man as being a mister.

Although it is formally an incorrect use of the term, Reverend is sometimes used alone, without a name, as a reference to a member of the clergy and treated as a normal English noun requiring a definite or indefinite article (e.g. We spoke to the reverend yesterday.). It is likewise incorrect to form the plural Reverends.  Some dictionaries, however, do place the noun rather than the adjective as the word's principal form, owing to an increasing use of the word as a noun among people with no religious background or knowledge of traditional styles of ecclesiastical address. When several clergy are referred to, they are often styled individually (e.g. The Reverend John Smith and the Reverend Henry Brown); but in a list of clergy, The Revv is sometimes put before the list of names, especially in the Catholic Church in the United Kingdom and Ireland.

In some churches, especially Protestant churches in the United States, ordained ministers are often addressed as Pastor (as in Pastor John or Pastor Smith). Pastor, however, is considered more correct in some churches when the minister in question is the head of a church or congregation. Some Protestant churches style their male ministers The Reverend Mister and a variation for female ministers.

Male Christian priests are sometimes addressed as Father or, for example, as Father John or Father Smith. However, in official correspondence, such priests are not normally referred to as Father John, Father Smith, or Father John Smith, but as The Reverend John Smith. Father as an informal title is used for Catholic, Orthodox and Old Catholic priests and for many priests of the Anglican and Lutheran churches. In England, however, even Catholic priests were often referred to as "Mr" until the 20th century except when members of a religious order. "Mr" is still usual for priests of the Church of England.

Some female Anglican or Old Catholic priests use the style The Reverend Mother and are addressed as Mother.

In a unique case, Reverend was used to refer to a church consistory, a local administrative body. "Reverend Coetus" and "Reverend Assembly" were used to refer to the entire body of local officials during the transformation of the Dutch Reformed Church in the mid-18th century.

Variations

The Reverend may be modified to reflect ecclesiastical standing and rank. Modifications vary across religious traditions and countries. Some common examples are:

Christianity

Catholic

 Religious sisters may be styled as Reverend Sister (in writing), though this is more common in Italy than in, for example, the United States. They may be addressed as Sister (in writing or in speaking).
 Deacons are addressed as
 The Reverend Deacon (in writing), or Father Deacon (in writing or speaking), or simply Deacon (in speaking), if ordained permanently to the diaconate.
 The Reverend Mister (in writing) may be used for seminarians who are ordained to the diaconate, before being ordained presbyters; Deacon (in speaking); nearly never Father Deacon when referring to a Latin Church deacon in English.
 Priests, whether secular, in an order of canons regular, a monastic or a mendicant order, or clerics regular  The Reverend or The Reverend Father (in writing).
 Protonotaries Apostolic, Prelates of Honor and Chaplains of His Holiness: The Reverend Monsignor (in writing).
 Priests with various grades of jurisdiction above pastor (e.g., vicars general, judicial vicars, ecclesiastical judges, episcopal vicars, provincials of religious orders of priests, rectors or presidents of colleges and universities, priors of monasteries, deans, vicars forane, archpriests): The Very Reverend (in writing).
 Abbots of monasteries: The Right Reverend (in writing).
 Abbesses of convents: The Reverend Mother Superior, with their convent's name following (e.g., The Reverend Mother Superior of the Poor Clares of Boston in written form, while being referred to simply as Mother Superior in speech).
 Bishops and archbishops: The Most Reverend.
 In some countries of the Commonwealth, such as the United Kingdom (but not in Northern Ireland), only archbishops are styled The Most Reverend (and addressed as "Your Grace") and other bishops are styled The Right Reverend.
 Cardinals are styled as His Eminence 
 Patriarchs as His Beatitude
 Patriarchs of Eastern-rite Catholic churches (those in full communion with Rome) who are made Cardinals are titled His Beatitude and Eminence
 The Catholic Pope and other Eastern-rite Catholic or Orthodox leaders with the title Pope as His Holiness

None of the clergy are usually addressed in speech as Reverend or The Reverend alone. Generally, Father is acceptable for all three orders of clergy, though in some countries this is customary for priests only. Deacons may be addressed as Deacon, honorary prelates as Monsignor; bishops and archbishops as Your Excellency (or Your Grace in Commonwealth countries), or, in informal settings, as Bishop, Archbishop, etc.

Eastern Orthodox

 A deacon is often styled as The Reverend Deacon (or Hierodeacon, Archdeacon, Protodeacon, according to ecclesiastical elevation), while in spoken use the title Father is used (sometimes Father Deacon).
 A married priest is The Reverend Father; a monastic priest is The Reverend Hieromonk; a protopresbyter is The Very Reverend Father; and an archimandrite is either The Very Reverend Father (Greek practice) or The Right Reverend Father (Russian practice). All may be simply addressed as Father.
 Abbots and abbesses are styled The Very Reverend Abbot/Abbess and are addressed as Father and Mother respectively.
 A bishop is referred to as The Right Reverend Bishop and addressed as Your Grace (or Your Excellency).
 An archbishop or metropolitan, whether or not he is the head of an autocephalous or autonomous church, is styled The Most Reverend Archbishop/Metropolitan and addressed as Your Eminence.
 Heads of autocephalous and autonomous churches with the title Patriarch are styled differently, according to the customs of their respective churches, usually Beatitude but sometimes Holiness and exceptionally All-Holiness.

Anglican
 Deacons are styled as The Reverend, The Reverend Deacon, or The Reverend Mr/Mrs/Miss.
 Priests are usually styled as The Reverend, The Reverend Father/Mother (even if not a religious) or The Reverend Mr/Mrs/Miss.
 Heads of some women's religious orders are styled as The Reverend Mother (even if not ordained).
 Canons are usually styled as The Reverend Canon (sometimes abbreviated as "Cn").
 Deans are usually styled as The Very Reverend.
 Archdeacons are usually styled as The Venerable (abbreviated as "The Ven").
 Priors of monasteries may be styled as The Very Reverend.
 Abbots of monasteries may be styled as The Right Reverend.
 Bishops are styled as The Right Reverend and, traditionally, His Lordship if a male diocesan bishop (or His/Her Grace in the United States).
 Archbishops and primates and (for historical reasons) the Bishop of Meath and Kildare are styled as The Most Reverend.
 Some archbishops, such as the Archbishop of Canterbury, are also styled His/Her Grace.

Baptist

Among Southern Baptists in the United States, pastors are often referred to in written communication and formal address as Reverend. However,  Southern Baptist pastors are often  orally addressed as either Brother (e.g., Brother Smith, as New Testament writers describe Christians as being brothers and sisters in Christ) or Pastor (as in Pastor Smith or simply Pastor without the pastor's last name).

Many African American Baptists use "Reverend" informally and formally, however correctly The Reverend John Smith or The Reverend Mary Smith.

Members of the National Baptist Convention usually refer to their pastors as The Reverend.

Lutheran

 Deacons: Commonly styled Deacon and their last name (such as Deacon Smith)
Pastors: The Reverend is usually written, but the person is commonly orally addressed as Pastor Smith or "Pastor John"; the latter frequently used by members of their congregation.
 Priests:  The formal style for a priest is either The Reverend or The Very Reverend, but for male priests the title Father and the person's last name are frequently used (such as Father Smith).
 Bishops are styled as The Right Reverend.
 In America the style The Reverend Bishop or simply Bishop and the person's last name are more frequently used.
 Archbishops are styled as The Most Reverend.

Methodist

In some Methodist churches, especially in the United States, ordained and licensed ministers are usually addressed as Reverend, unless they hold a doctorate in which case they are often addressed in formal situations as The Reverend Doctor. In informal situations Reverend is used. The Reverend, however, is used in more formal or in written communication, along with His/Her Reverence or Your Reverence. Brother or Sister is used in some places, although these are formally used to address members of Methodist religious orders, such as the Saint Brigid of Kildare Monastery. Use of these forms of address differs depending on the location of the church or annual conference.

In British Methodism, ordained ministers can be either presbyters (ministers of word and sacrament) or deacons (ministers of witness and service). Presbyters are addressed as The Revd (with given name and surname) or as Mr/Mrs/Miss/Ms with surname alone.

The United Methodist Church in the United States often addresses its ministers as Reverend (e.g., Reverend Smith). The Reverend, however, is still used in more formal or official written communication.

Presbyterian

Church ministers are styled The Reverend. The moderators of the General Assemblies of the Church of Scotland, the Presbyterian Church in Ireland, the Presbyterian Church of Australia, the Presbyterian Church in Canada and the United Church of Canada, when ordained clergy, are styled The Right Reverend during their year of service and The Very Reverend afterwards. Moderators of the General Assembly of the Presbyterian Church (USA) are styled simply The Reverend. By tradition in the Church of Scotland, the ministers of St Giles' Cathedral, Edinburgh (also known as the High Kirk of Edinburgh) and Paisley Abbey are styled The Very Reverend.  In Presbyterian courts where elders hold equal status with ministers it is correct to refer to ministers by their title (Mr, Mrs, Dr, Prof etc.).  Traditionally in Scotland ministers are referred to in their communities in this way and this is an entirely correct form of address.

Restoration Movement
Like some other groups that assert the lack of clerical titles within the church as narrated in the New Testament, congregations in the Restoration Movement (i.e., influenced by Barton Warren Stone and Alexander Campbell), often disdain use of The Reverend and instead use the more generalized designation Brother. The practice is universal within the Churches of Christ and prevalent in the Christian Churches and Churches of Christ but has become uncommon in the Disciples of Christ, which use The Reverend for ordained ministers.

Community of Christ

Internally, members of the priesthood do not use The Reverend as a style, but are generally known as "brother" or "sister" or by their specific priesthood office ("deacon", "teacher" or "priest" are often appended after the person's name, instead of, for example, "Deacon John Adams" or "Deacon Adams", and generally only in written form; in contrast, elders, bishops, evangelists, apostles, etc. are often, for example, known as "Bishop John Smith" or "Bishop Smith").  Any member of the priesthood who presides over a congregation can, and often is, known as "pastor" or (if an elder), "presiding elder".   Such use might only be in reference to occupying that position ("she is the pastor") as opposed to being used as a style ("Pastor Jane").  Priesthood members presiding over multiple congregations or various church councils are often termed "president".  Externally, in ecumenical settings, The Reverend is sometimes used.

Nondenominational

In some countries, including the United States, the title Pastor (such as Pastor Smith in more formal address or Pastor John in less formal) is often used in many nondenominational Christian traditions rather than The Reverend or Reverend.

Judaism

The primary Jewish religious leader is a rabbi, which denotes that they have received rabbinical ordination (semicha). They are addressed as Rabbi or Rabbi Surname or (especially in Sephardic and Mizrachi) as Hakham.

The use of the Christian terms "Reverend" and "minister" for the rabbi of a congregation was common in Classical Reform Judaism and in the British Empire in the 19th and early 20th centuries, especially if the rabbi had attended a Western-style seminary or university rather than a traditional yeshiva.

Some small communities without a rabbi may be led by a hazzan (cantor), who is addressed (in English) as "Reverend". For this reason, and because hazzanim are often recognized as clergy by secular authorities for purposes such as registering marriages; other hazzanim may be addressed as Reverend, although Cantor is more common.

Notes

References

External links

 
 

Ecclesiastical styles